Llyn Dinas is a lake near Beddgelert, Gwynedd in north Wales. It is formed by the River Glaslyn.

Llyn Dinas lies on the valley floor a few miles north of Beddgelert at an altitude of about 55 metres above sea level. The lake offers good fishing for salmon and trout.

It takes its name from the nearby Dinas Emrys, a rocky and wooded hill just downstream of the lake where the remains of both medieval and older fortifications have been found. A rock near the lake named Carreg yr Eryr (The stone of the eagle) was said in a charter of 1198 to mark the spot where the boundaries of the three cantrefs of Aberconwy, Ardudwy and Arfon met. According to Giraldus Cambrensis an eagle used to perch on it once a week, anticipating battle between the men of the three cantrefs.

References
Geraint Roberts (1995) The lakes of Eryri Carreg Gwalch 

Beddgelert
Dinas
Dinas
Tourism in Gwynedd
Tourism in Snowdonia